The Institute for Language and Preparatory Studies at Charles University established the Centre for Distance Education in order to prepare distant on-line courses. The Centre is located in Poděbrady at the Poděbrady Castle.

Initially, language courses in the form of blended learning, which is a combination of e-learning and attendance conversational meetings, were chosen. The language courses include courses of Czech language for foreigners and courses of English. English courses available are intended for elementary, pre-intermediate, intermediate, upper-intermediate and FCE students, Czech courses available are intended for A1 and A2 levels (CEFR). A B1 level course is being prepared.

The Institute cooperated on a project called @languages within the framework of the European Union program Leonardo da Vinci. Its aim was to create a course of business English for SMEs.

See also
Common European Framework of Reference for Languages
Electronic learning
Blended learning

External links
CDE Poděbrady
Institute for Language and Preparatory Studies at Charles University
Charles University

Charles University
2004 establishments in the Czech Republic